Jannik Huth (born 15 April 1994) is a German professional footballer who plays as a goalkeeper for SC Paderborn 07.

Club career
Born in Bad Kreuznach, Huth grew up in nearby Guldental and started playing football with local clubs SG Guldental and Hassia Bingen.

Subsequently, he joined the youth ranks of Mainz 05 and eventually made it to their second team squad. He made his 3. Liga debut with Mainz 05 II at 5 October 2014 against Holstein Kiel.

In January 2018, Huth joined Eredivisie side Sparta Rotterdam on loan until the end of the season.

International career
In late August 2015, Huth received his first ever call for a Germany youth team. He was nominated as a replacement for Odisseas Vlachodimos in the under-21 team.

He was part of the squad for the 2016 Summer Olympics, where Germany won the silver medal.

Honours
Germany
Summer Olympic Games: Silver Medal, 2016

References

External links

1994 births
Living people
People from Bad Kreuznach
German footballers
Footballers from Rhineland-Palatinate
Association football goalkeepers
Germany under-21 international footballers
Bundesliga players
3. Liga players
Eredivisie players
BFV Hassia Bingen players
1. FSV Mainz 05 players
1. FSV Mainz 05 II players
Sparta Rotterdam players
SC Paderborn 07 players
Footballers at the 2016 Summer Olympics
Olympic footballers of Germany
Medalists at the 2016 Summer Olympics
Olympic silver medalists for Germany
Olympic medalists in football
German expatriate footballers
Expatriate footballers in the Netherlands